"My Boo" is a duet between American R&B singers Usher and Alicia Keys, written by Usher, Keys, Jermaine Dupri, Adonis Shropshire, and Manuel Seal. It was included on the re-release of Usher's fourth studio album, Confessions (2004). The song was released as the album's fourth single in 2004. Set over a hip hop-style track, it was produced by Dupri and No I.D.

The song received positive reviews from critics, and has garnered awards. The single stayed on top of the Billboard Hot 100 for six weeks, making it the third most-successful single from the album after "Yeah!" and "Burn", respectively. It was also ranked as the 36th biggest song of the 2000–2009 decade in the United States.

The song was later remade by the smooth jazz supergroup Urban Knights, which was fronted by pianist Ramsey Lewis.

Background
Usher and Alicia Keys had previously collaborated with the remix of Keys' 2004 single "If I Ain't Got You", which was released in the United Kingdom. During the production of Usher's fourth studio album, Confessions, they thought of various female singers to pair him with on the song. Usher and Kortney Kaycee Leveringston's rare demo version can be found floating on the Internet. Although it was and still is widely believed that it was Beyoncé. However, Jermaine Dupri, who co-wrote the song including Usher's number-one hits "Yeah!", "Burn", and "Confessions Part II", felt that he had established good relationship with Keys since she had worked with him and Usher.

The song is written from the perspectives of Keys and Usher, who play the role of an ex-couple. For him, Usher and Keys "talk about how they used to be in love and how those feelings are still lingering despite the two not being involved anymore." For Keys, "The song is talking about the first person you ever really had feelings for. Even though you move on and meet new people, you always remember that first person."

Release
"My Boo" was not included in the final track listing of Confessions (neither were Red Light" or the songs Usher recorded with P. Diddy and The Neptunes). Instead, "My Boo" and "Red Light" were leaked to the Internet, along with other songs not included on the first album release. The song was included in the expanded version of Confessions, alongside "Red Light" and "Sweet Lies" (which were only released in the UK version of the album).

Dupri thought of releasing "My Boo" as the fourth single from Confessions once "Confessions Part II" would be leaving the charts. LaFace Records sent "My Boo" to US contemporary hit radio on August 29, 2004, and to US urban contemporary radio on August 30, 2004. The single was released in the United States as a 12" single on September 21, 2004. It was a double A-side with "Confessions Part II" when it was released in the United Kingdom on November 1, 2004.

Composition and reception

"My Boo" is a hip hop-tinged R&B song with a mid-tempo melody. It is composed in the key of D minor, in common time. The lyrics are constructed in verse-chorus-chorus form. Usher starts the intro, and Keys followed her rap-intro, with background vocals from Usher. He proceeds to the first verse and chorus, leading to Keys singing another chorus, altering some of the lyrics of the original chorus to create a dialogue. Keys sings the second verse and Usher for the chorus, with background vocals from Keys. Keys repeats her version for the chorus. The song breaks with Usher and Keys singing "My oh, My oh, My oh, My oh, My Boo", one after the other. Usher repeats the chorus again, and they sing the intro of Keys. The 1977 song "He's All I’ve Got" by Love Unlimited is sampled in the song

The song received positive reviews from critics. Jon Caramanica of Rolling Stone found the duet sentimental. At the 2005 Grammy Awards, it was nominated for Best R&B Song and Best R&B Performance by a Duo or Group with Vocals; to which it won the latter and the former was awarded to Alicia Keys' song, "You Don't Know My Name". Usher and Keys won for Best R&B/Soul Single by a Duo or Group during the 2005 Soul Train Music Awards. In 2011, Billboard ranked the song seventh on a special The 40 Biggest Duets of All Time listing.

Chart performance
"My Boo" was successful in the United States, living up to the chart performances of "Yeah!", "Burn" and "Confessions Part II". The single debuted on the Billboard Hot 100 twenty-nine, the highest U.S. entry among all singles released from the album. It entered the top ten, two weeks after, and peaked at number one during its eighth-week stay on the chart. The single remained on the top for six weeks, beating its predecessor "Confessions Part II", which charted at number one for two weeks. However, it failed to match the success of "Yeah!" and "Burn" for twelve- and eight-week run on the top, respectively. It stayed on the top ten for nineteen weeks, leaving the chart after twenty-six weeks. The single was successful on Billboard component charts, topping the Hot R&B/Hip-Hop Songs and Hot Ringtones. In Europe, the single had divided responses. The single reached the top five in United Kingdom, Germany, the Netherlands, Norway and Switzerland. It entered the top twenty in France, Finland and Switzerland, and top thirty in Austria.

Music video

Directed by both Usher and music video director Chris Robinson, "My Boo" clip was filmed in New York City. The storyline of the video is a reflection of the song's lyrics. The footage starts with Usher in a living room watching a video for "Bad Girl", a song from Confessions. The "Bad Girl" intro features Usher singing the song in a club setting while admiring a scantily-dressed woman. He turns the set off and slumps down on the sofa before laying on it with his foot propped up. After a moment of silent, nostalgic reflection, he starts to sing the intro of "My Boo". The video then shows him and Alicia Keys in their separate quarters, preparing to head out, while singing their part of the song. Usher eventually steps out on streets of New York; likewise, Keys is out in her car. She leaves the car and walks down the street, and the couple meet up in the middle of Times Square, cuddling each other and on the brink of kissing. The music video debuted on MTV's TRL at number nine on September 16, 2004. It remained on the countdown for twenty-seven days, becoming the only Confession video to chart.

Track listings
UK CD 1
 "Confessions Part II"
 "My Boo" (Duet with Alicia Keys)

UK CD 2
 "Confessions Part II"
 "My Boo" (Duet with Alicia Keys)
 "Confessions Part II" (Remix) (featuring Shyne, Kanye West & Twista)
 "Confessions Part II" (Music Video)

Charts

Weekly charts

Year-end charts

Decade-end charts

All-time charts

Certifications

See also
 List of number-one R&B singles of 2004 (U.S.)
 List of Hot 100 number-one singles of 2004 (U.S.)
 Billboard Year-End Hot 100 singles of 2004
 List of number-one singles from 2001 to 2007 (Canada)

References

External links
 My Boo at Discogs

Usher (musician) songs
Alicia Keys songs
2000s ballads
2004 singles
2004 songs
Billboard Hot 100 number-one singles
Canadian Singles Chart number-one singles
Contemporary R&B ballads
LaFace Records singles
Male–female vocal duets
Music videos directed by Chris Robinson (director)
Song recordings produced by Jermaine Dupri
Song recordings produced by No I.D.
Songs written by Adonis Shropshire
Songs written by Alicia Keys
Songs written by Jermaine Dupri
Songs written by Manuel Seal
Songs written by Usher (musician)
Soul ballads